The As or Az were a Turkic people from the Eastern and Southern Altai and are associated with the Türkic period Kudyrge culture in the Altai. According to L.P. Potapov, the names of the Telengit seoks (Tёrtas – “four As”, Djeti-as – “seven As”, Baylangas – “numerous As”) suggest that the As tribe was a part of the Turkic Tiele, and is certainly connected with the modern-day Altai population. The As left the runic Kalbak-Tash II inscription which was written in Turkic language.
 
Their existence is confirmed by the Tannu-Ola mountains inscriptions of Mugur-Sargol and Bayan-Kol and certain verses of the Göktürks, while describing the battles between the Göktürks and the Kyrgyz. According to the Bayan-Kol inscriptions, the As were divided to many clans living in the region of Mugur west of the Tannu-Ola mountains. There are also writings from the 8th century (around 714 AD) in Uyghur sources about the uprising of the As against the Göktürks.

Name 
Research has also been done by Russian linguist experts who trace them as close ethnically to Ket people of Yenisei basin in Siberia due to similarities in name between Old Turkic 𐰔𐰉𐰆𐰑𐰣 As budun and the Assans, an extinct Yeniseic Kott dialect, but without solid proof. The primary information on their language was collected by Matthias Castrén in 1845, with further research and information added later by the anthropologist Dmitry Anuchin.
 
Meanwhile, within Vasily Abaev's Alans framework, the As were also hypothesized by pro-Iranist scholars to be Turkicized descendants of alleged Iranian-speakers, particularly Asiani-Wusun, of which the Wusun evidently had a Turkic-Altaic language. In order to connect the As with non-Turkic tribes, supporters of the Iranian theory claim that the As only used Turkic language for writing, not for speaking.
 
The name As has been suggested to live on in the names of several other peoples of southern Siberia: the Kamas ("Mountain As"), the Karagas ("Black As" or "Plains As"), and the Khakas ("White As"). Similar names of genealogical nature are ascertainable among modern and historical Turkic tribes: Old Bulgars, Nogais, Altaians, Turkmens, Uzbeks, Kazan Tatars and Kazakhs.
 
A wide toponymic distribution of the name As, Az and Ash is found in Turkey, Azerbaijan, Central Asia and Altai region.

References

 
 

 
Ethnic groups in Siberia
Extinct Turkic peoples